Tula Toli, also known as Min Gyi, is a village in the Maungdaw District of Rakhine State, Myanmar, near the Bangladesh–Myanmar border. Myanmar Army soldiers carried out a massacre against Rohingyas in the village on 30 August 2017, allegedly with the support of local Rakhines who also resided in the village.

References

Populated places in Rakhine State